Ubenimex (INN), also known more commonly as bestatin, is a competitive, reversible protease inhibitor. It is an inhibitor of arginyl aminopeptidase (aminopeptidase B), leukotriene A4 hydrolase (a zinc metalloprotease that displays both epoxide hydrolase and aminopeptidase activities), alanyl aminopeptidase (aminopeptidase M/N), leucyl/cystinyl aminopeptidase (oxytocinase/vasopressinase), and membrane dipeptidase (leukotriene D4 hydrolase). It is being studied for use in the treatment of acute myelocytic leukemia and lymphedema.
It is derived from Streptomyces olivoreticuli. Ubenimex has been found to inhibit the enzymatic degradation of oxytocin, vasopressin, enkephalins, and various other peptides and compounds.

See also
 Amastatin
 Pepstatin

References

External links
 The MEROPS online database for peptidases and their inhibitors: Bestatin

Enkephalinase inhibitors
Protease inhibitors
Experimental cancer drugs
Secondary amino acids